Move It Like This is the seventh studio album released by Bahamas-based group Baha Men. It was released in 2002 under the S-Curve label. The album includes a cover of Harry Nilsson's "Coconut". None of the songs rose to success, including the album's title single "Move It Like This," but the album did chart  at number 57 on the Billboard 200. Two of the songs were used in feature films including "Move It Like This" (Big Fat Liar) and "Best Years of Our Lives" (Shrek). One of the VEE's Shows used this song in "Barney Live in Concert".

Track listing 

 "Move It Like This" – 3:24
 "Coconut" – 4:00
 "Normal" – 3:17
 "I Thank Heaven" – 4:05
 "Best Years of Our Lives" – 2:57
 "Break Away" – 3:13
 "Rich in Love" (with guest vocals by Daphne Rubin-Vega) – 4:42
 "Giddyup" – 4:09
 "Blow Your Mind" – 3:49
 "We Rubbin'" – 3:05
 "I Just Want to Fool Around" – 3:32 
 "Wave" – 4:01   
 "Move It Like This (Shake It Like That Mix)" – 3:31

Charts

Certifications and sales

References 

2002 albums
Baha Men albums
S-Curve Records albums